Borgo Misto is a neighbourhood in the northern area of the city of Cinisello Balsamo, in Italy, bordering with the neighbourhood of Sant'Eusebio and with Taccona of Muggiò.

References

Districts of Cinisello Balsamo

it:Borgo Misto